Johni Broome (born July 19, 2002) is an American college basketball player for the Auburn Tigers of the Southeastern Conference (SEC). He previously played for the Morehead State Eagles of the Ohio Valley Conference (OVC).

High school career
Broome attended Plant City High School in Plant City, Florida and grew about six inches (15 cm) in two years. He transferred to Tampa Catholic High School in Tampa, Florida. As a senior, Broome averaged 19.6 points, 10.9 rebounds and 2.2 blocks per game and was named Hillsborough County Player of the Year. He committed to playing college basketball for Morehead State over offers from Florida Atlantic, Georgia Southern, Jacksonville and Bryant.

College career
Broome immediately assumed an important role at Morehead State after Tyzhaun Claude suffered a torn anterior cruciate ligament during practice before the season. At the conclusion of the regular season, he was named Ohio Valley Conference (OVC) Freshman of the Year and earned First Team All-OVC honors. He was a nine-time OVC Freshman of the Week, breaking the program record previously held by Kenneth Faried, who earned the accolade eight times. On March 6, 2021, Broome posted 27 points and 12 rebounds in an 86–71 win over top-seeded Belmont at the OVC tournament final. He was named tournament MVP. Broome averaged 13.8 points, nine rebounds and 1.9 blocks per game as a freshman.

He averaged 16.8 points, 10.5 rebounds and 3.9 blocks per game as a sophomore. As a sophomore, Broome was again named to the First Team All-OVC, as well as Defensive Player of the Year. On April 4, 2022, Broome entered the transfer portal. On April 30, Broome announced that he would be transferring to Auburn over Florida.

Career statistics

College

|-
| style="text-align:left;"| 2020–21
| style="text-align:left;"| Morehead State
| 30 || 27 || 25.8 || .571 || – || .618 || 9.0 || .7 || .6 || 1.9 || 13.8
|-
| style="text-align:left;"| 2021–22
| style="text-align:left;"| Morehead State
| 34 || 34 || 28.3 || .555 || .000 || .636 || 10.5 || 1.2 || .7 || 3.9 || 16.8
|- class="sortbottom"
| style="text-align:center;" colspan="2"| Career
| 64 || 61 || 27.1 || .561 || .000 || .628 || 9.8 || 1.0 || .7 || 2.9 || 15.4

Personal life
Broome's older brother, John Jr., played college football for FIU. His favorite NBA player is James Harden.

References

External links
Auburn Tigers bio
Morehead State Eagles bio

2002 births
Living people
American men's basketball players
Auburn Tigers men's basketball players
Basketball players from Florida
Centers (basketball)
Morehead State Eagles men's basketball players
People from Plant City, Florida
Power forwards (basketball)